Environmental cleanup laws govern the removal of pollution or contaminants from environmental media such as soil, sediment, surface water, or ground water. Unlike pollution control laws, cleanup laws are designed to respond after-the-fact to environmental contamination, and consequently must often define not only the necessary response actions, but also the parties who may be responsible for undertaking (or paying for) such actions. Regulatory requirements may include rules for emergency response, liability allocation, site assessment, remedial investigation, feasibility studies, remedial action, post-remedial monitoring, and site reuse.

Different laws may govern the cleanup or remediation of varying environmental media. Spill response or cleanup requirements may be enacted as stand-alone laws, or as parts of larger laws focused on a specific environmental medium or pollutant.

Emergency response and prevention 

Environmental cleanup laws may contain requirements for identifying and responding to environmental emergencies. In such cases, laws may define when immediate response actions are required, or criteria by which a regulatory agency may make such a determination. Immediate response actions may be required, for example, when a release of a pollutant into the environment poses an immediate threat to human health or ecological values. Events such as oil spills and large-scale chemical releases often trigger emergency response actions.

Environmental remediation 

Environmental remediation is the process of physically removing, treating, or isolating pollutants in environmental media. Environmental cleanup laws may contain specific requisite remediation protocols, or may contain standards and processes by which a regulatory agency may determine an appropriate remedy.

References

Notes 

Environmental law